Fucking Hell is a 2008 installation artwork by Jake and Dinos Chapman depicting a monumental battle of miniature skeletons, Nazis, and others. It is a recreation of their 1999 Hell, which was lost in a fire. It sold for £7.5 million.

References

Further reading

External links 

 

Installation art works